Technicolor Creative Studios UK Limited, doing business as The Mill, is a British VFX production company and creative studio headquartered in London, England, with three offices in the United States (New York, Los Angeles, Chicago), three others in Europe (Paris, Amsterdam & Berlin) and three in Asia (Shanghai, Seoul and Bangalore). It is owned by Technicolor Creative Studios. The Mill produces real-time visual effects, animation, moving images, design, experiential, and digital projects for the advertising, games, and music industries.

In January 2022, Josh Mandel became President of The Mill after having initially joined The Mill's studio in Los Angeles as Managing Director/President in 2019 and becoming Chief Executive Officer in January 2021.

History

Founding
In 1990, Robin Shenfield and Pat Joseph opened The Mill in Soho, London. Starting as a visual effects house for the advertising industry, it was the first VFX company in Europe to use exclusively digital methods.

Global operations
2002 saw The Mill open a studio in New York, becoming the first UK visual effects house to do so. The extension of operations to the US was successful, with the company growing to employ over 100 staff by 2009.

The Mill was also launched in Los Angeles in 2007 – the first UK visual effects house to open on the West Coast – and the new venture was highly successful.

In 2013 The Mill opened a new office in Chicago, sharing its premises with editorial house The Whitehouse in the Courthouse Place building.

In 2022 The Mill opened its studio in Seoul, and because of the unity with MPC Advertising, also expanded to open studios in Paris, Amsterdam and Shanghai.

Ownership
In 2011 The Mill was acquired by The Carlyle Group, who then sold it to Barclays Private Equity (later rebranded as Equistone Partners Europe). On 15 September 2015, Technicolor SA acquired The Mill for €259 million from Equistone.

In May 2020, the "Mill Film" section of the company was folded into the visual effects firm MR. X (another division of Technicolor - now known as MPC) in response to the economic effects of the COVID-19 pandemic, while The Mill continued as a separate entity.

In January 2022, The Mill united with MPC Advertising to create one global studio network under The Mill brand. As a global studio The Mill made this change to scale up for a creative future, investing in new talent, production capabilities, and immersive technologies.

Current operations

Offerings 
The Mill is involved in a range of visual effects and design projects in the commercial, gaming and music industries. The company's supervisors, producers and artists supported all stages of production, from pre-visualisation and conceptual artwork, shoot supervision, 3D, 2D and color grading through to delivery of the finished project.

Expanded offerings
Beam.tv was launched in 2002 as an online digital delivery and content management platform.  Beam was originally established as an in-house FTP process to allow clients to review and approve visual-effects work being completed by The Mill in London. AdText.tv launched in 2008 for commercial subtitling.

Mill+ launched in 2013 as a creative studio focusing on motion graphics, design and animation.

BEAM.TV

BEAM.TV is an online digital delivery and content management platform. Beam, still part of the Mill group, was established as an in-house FTP process following the making of the film Gladiator. This simple process enabled director Sir Ridley Scott to immediately review and approve visual effects work being completed by The Mill in London – while he was still shooting in Malta.  This required a real-time digital platform with a toolset that would instinctively serve the demands of the filmmaking process.

In 2011 Beam has over 125 people working in London, New York City and Los Angeles.

Beam distributes almost half of all UK television commercials and is the exclusive partner to Unilever for the international distribution of all its television commercials worldwide.

Beam has developed bespoke systems to manage the entry and judging processes for international advertising awards, including Cannes Lions, BTAA (British Arrows) and The ANDY's.

As part of Technicolor Creative Studios, Beam now has locations in Shanghai, Amsterdam, Los Angeles, New York and Seoul.

Filmography

Feature films 
 Love and Monsters
 Harry Potter and the Philosopher's Stone
 Cats & Dogs
 Hilary and Jackie
 The Count of Monte Cristo
 Gladiator
 Harry Potter and the Chamber of Secrets
 Lara Croft: Tomb Raider
 Harry Potter and the Prisoner of Azkaban
 In The Heights
 Da 5 Bloods
 Ghost In The Shell
 Bumblebee
 Detective Pikachu
 C'mon C'mon

Television 
 ITV “1” idents (2006)
 BBC TWO curve idents (2018–)
 BBC – 2020 Summer Olympics
 Doctor Who (2005-2011)
 Torchwood (2006-2009)
 The Sarah Jane Adventures (2007-2011)
 Atlanta (2016-)
 Tales From The Loop (2020-)
 Severance (2022-)

Music videos 
 The Chemical Brothers - Wide Open (2015)
 Jay-Z – The Story of O.J. (2017)
 Cashmere Cat – Emotions and For Your Eyes Only (2019)
 FKA Twigs – Sad Day (2019)
 Dua Lipa – Hallucinate (2020)
 Doja Cat and the Weeknd – You Right (2021)
 Kanye West – Hurricane (2021)
 Calvin Harris, Dua Lipa and Young Thug – Potion (2022)
 Megan Thee Stallion – Plan B (2022)
 Calvin Harris, Justin Timberlake, Halsey, and Pharrell Williams – Stay with Me (2022)

Commercials 
 Bud Light (2011)
 Xfinity – X1 (2015)
 John Lewis – The Boy & The Piano (2018)
 Ridley Scott's Hennessy – Seven Worlds (2019)
 PlayStation – The Last of Us pt. II (2020)
 Burberry – Festive (2020)
 Smart Energy – Einstein (2021)
 Verizon – The Reset (2021)
 Paramount+ – Journey to the Peak (2021)

Awards
 Film and Television

References

Film production companies of the United States
Film production companies of the United Kingdom
Television and film post-production companies
Visual effects companies
Entertainment companies established in 1990
Technicolor Creative Studios